Charles Chadwick (November 19, 1874 – September 28, 1953) was an All-American football player and Yale strong man who graduated from Yale in 1897.  His younger brother, George, was also a Yale All-American and captain of the undefeated Yale football team in 1902. He competed at the 1904 Summer Olympics. He was born in Brooklyn and died in Boston, Massachusetts.

Following his athletic career at Yale, Charles got his law degree and lawyered in New York City for a few years before he became a well-known sportswriter for the New York World and a syndicated sports columnist.  He also authored at least two books.

References

External links
 
 

1874 births
1953 deaths
American football guards
American male shot putters
American male hammer throwers
Olympic track and field athletes of the United States
Athletes (track and field) at the 1904 Summer Olympics
Yale Bulldogs football players
Olympic weight throwers
Olympic tug of war competitors of the United States
Tug of war competitors at the 1904 Summer Olympics